Elisa Bartoli (born 7 May 1991) is an Italian professional footballer who plays as a right back for Serie A club AS Roma and the Italy women's national team.

Club career
During that time, Bartoli was part of Roma CF's promotion from Serie B to Serie A within her first three seasons at the club. Bartoli decided to move from her native Rome in the summer of 2012,  joining ASD Torres Calcio in for the 2012-2013 season.

Bartoli won a Serie A league title and two Supercoppa trophies during her time with Torres, but was faced with the club missing the deadline to register themselves for Serie A competition in the summer of 2015. Bartoli then chose to sign with ASD Mozzanica, but would later claim that the move up to Northern Italy wasn't to her liking. Bartoli earned the nickname "Gladiator" with Mozzanica, but cut short her stay with the Bergamo-based club to join Fiorentina a year later.

At Fiorentina, Bartoli enjoyed more success with a league title win and Coppa Italia victories. Having established herself as a household name in Serie A and an international defender with Italy, Bartoli took the decision to return to her native Rome in the summer of 2018. Bartoli joined the newly-formed A.S. Roma Women. Her decision meant she became the club's first captain in their history, while Roma set themselves a club target of winning silverware within their first four seasons.

That target was achieved in May 2021, with Roma captain Elisa Bartoli raising the Coppa Italia trophy as she helped her hometown club defeat AC Milan on penalties.

International career
She was called up to be part of the national team for the UEFA Women's Euro 2013.

International goals

Honours

Club
Roma CF
 Serie A2: 2007–08

ASD Torres Calcio
 Serie A: 2012-13
 Supercup (2): 2012, 2013

Fiorentina
 Serie A: 2016-2017
 Coppa Italia (2): 2016-2017, 2017-2018

Roma
 Coppa Italia: 2020–21

International
Italy U19
 UEFA Women's Under-19 Championship: 2008

Individual
 AIC Best Women's XI (2): 2019, 2020

References

External links 

 
 Profile at fussballtransfers.com
 
 Profile at soccerdonna.de

1991 births
Living people
Italian women's footballers
Italy women's international footballers
Serie A (women's football) players
Torres Calcio Femminile players
Women's association football defenders
Fiorentina Women's F.C. players
A.S. Roma (women) players
Footballers from Rome
Atalanta Mozzanica Calcio Femminile Dilettantistico players
2019 FIFA Women's World Cup players
Roma Calcio Femminile players
UEFA Women's Euro 2022 players
UEFA Women's Euro 2017 players